Nemški Rovt is a settlement in the Municipality of Bohinj in the Upper Carniola region of Slovenia.

History
In the first half of the 13th century, Germans from the Puster Valley founded the settlement of Deutschruth. Together with neighboring Zarz (Spodnja Sorica and Zgornja Sorica), it was part of a German language island for several centuries.

Church

The church in Nemški Rovt is dedicated to Saint Acacius. It belongs to the Parish of Bohinjska Bistrica.

References

External links

Nemški Rovt at Geopedia

Populated places in the Municipality of Bohinj